SkyXpress Airline was a Canadian air charter airline operator based in Calgary, Alberta. They catered to business and vacation travellers and would fly anywhere in North America. Its full name was Flight-Ops International, Inc.  Skyxpress ceased operations in November 2008  due to the financial crisis.

Fleet
As of August 2006 the Skyxpress Airline fleet was consist in:

2 BAe Jetstream 31
 Cessna 414 II

See also 
 List of defunct airlines of Canada

References

External links
Skyxpress Airline

Defunct airlines of Canada
Airlines disestablished in 2008